Son of Dracula is a 1974 British musical film directed by Freddie Francis and starring Harry Nilsson and Ringo Starr. It was produced by Starr and released in 1974 by Apple Films. It is also the title of a soundtrack released in conjunction with the film.

Plot
After the killing of his father (Count Dracula, the King of the Netherworld), by a mysterious assassin, Count Downe (Harry Nilsson) is summoned from his travels abroad by family advisor Merlin (Ringo Starr) in order to prepare him to take over the throne. Baron Frankenstein (Freddie Jones) is also on hand to help in any way he can. Problem is, Downe wants no part of this responsibility, and instead wishes to become human and mortal − especially after meeting a girl named Amber (Suzanna Leigh), with whom he falls in love. He approaches old family nemesis Dr. Van Helsing (Dennis Price), who agrees to enable the Count's transformation, much to the dismay of the residents of the Netherworld.

Despite the best efforts of a host of monsters, as well as one traitorous figure who is dealt with by the trusted Merlin, Van Helsing performs the operation and removes Downe's fangs. He then informs the Count that he can now live out his days in the sunlight, with Amber at his side.

Keith Moon of The Who and John Bonham of Led Zeppelin both appear in the film, alternating as the drummer in Count Downe's band. Other band members include Klaus Voormann (another old friend of Starr), Peter Frampton, an uncredited Leon Russell, and the regular Rolling Stones horn section of Bobby Keys and Jim Price.

Cast
Harry Nilsson – Count Downe
Ringo Starr – Merlin 
Freddie Jones – The Baron
Suzanna Leigh – Amber 
Dennis Price – Van Helsing 
Peter Frampton – Count Downe's Band member
John Bonham – Count Downe's Band member
Keith Moon – Count Downe's Band member
Klaus Voormann – Count Downe's Band member
Leon Russell – Count Downe's Band member
Skip Martin – Igor
David Bailie – Chauffeur 
Shakira Baksh – Housekeeper
Jenny Runacre – Woman in Black
Beth Morris – Wendy
Hedger Wallace - Vampire
Dan Meaden – Count Dracula
Lorna Wilde (Pamela Conway) – Countess Dracula
Tina Simmons - Ghoul - Uncredited
Derek Woodward - Werewolf
Louis Flannery - young Dracula

Production
Son of Dracula was made during a period when Starr, in between occasional single releases and session work, was concentrating on filmmaking and acting. Two films in which he had starred, 200 Motels and Blindman, had been released at the end of 1971, and before starting on this one, he had just finished work on his directorial debut, the T. Rex documentary Born to Boogie.

As well as producing Son of Dracula, Starr appears as Merlin the Magician, who follows the birth and rise of young Count Downe, played by Nilsson. Starr and he were longtime friends, and the ex-Beatle had recently played drums on Nilsson's 1972 album Son of Schmilsson, which had spoofed horror movie motifs. A few months after those sessions, in August 1972, Starr decided to make a rock and roll Dracula movie (originally titled Count Downe), and invited Nilsson to come on board. At first, Nilsson thought the whole idea must have come from his recent album; as it turned out, Starr had not followed its release, and until then-wife Maureen brought him a copy, he did not even know that Son of Schmilsson had already used a similar theme.

Release
Filming was completed by November 1972, but Son of Dracula  had to wait a year and a half for release. Soon after completion, Starr called in Graham Chapman, who was writing with Douglas Adams at the time and had been working on a proposed (but eventually unfilmed) television special for Ringo. Along with Chapman's other regular collaborator, Bernard McKenna, they were asked to write a whole new script to be dubbed over the film's lacklustre dialogue, and they recorded an alternative, Pythonesque soundtrack, but the whole idea was then shelved. Later, attempts were made to market the movie, but as Starr later said, ‘No one would take it.’

Showings over the years have been limited to midnight movies and similar outlets. No official home video release has ever been made.

Soundtrack album

The Son of Dracula album includes Nilsson songs that were showcased in the film, as well as some instrumental tracks composed by Paul Buckmaster and portions of dialogue used as bridging sequences. All the song tracks except one are from the previously released Nilsson Schmilsson and Son of Schmilsson albums.

The only new song, "Daybreak", was recorded in London sometime in September '72, during a break in filming. Joining Nilsson and Starr on the sessions at Trident Studios were the likes of Voormann, Frampton, Keys and Price, once again, as well as George Harrison on cowbell. Jim Price, along with pianist Gary Wright and orchestral arrangers Paul Buckmaster and Del Newman, also provided new, incidental music, some of which appeared in the film only.
The U.S. LP release of the soundtrack included a T-shirt iron-on advertising the film, and a companion songbook included a reproduction of the film poster. The single version of "Daybreak" edited out the words "it's pissing me off" (referring to daylight), repeating the lyric "it's making me cough" instead, and the fadeout is longer than on any LP or CD release of the song. The single peaked at number 21 on the Billboard Hot 100 but did not chart at all in the U.K. The album itself fared even worse, non-charting in Britain and climbing no higher than number 106 in America.

"Daybreak" was later covered by Nilsson friend and former Monkee Micky Dolenz. A version with completely new lyrics in German was sung as "Hamburg im Regen" by Mary Roos.

Album track listing
"It Is He Who Will Be King" (Paul Buckmaster) – 3:07
"Daybreak" (Nilsson) – 2:43
"At My Front Door" (Ewart Abner, John Moore) – 2:40
"Count Downe Meets Merlin and Amber" (Buckmaster) – 2:10
"The Moonbeam Song" (Nilsson) – 3:20
"Perhaps This Is All a Dream" (Buckmaster) – :47
"Remember (Christmas)" (Nilsson) – 4:09
"Intro; Without You" (Pete Ham, Tom Evans) – 3:47
"The Count's Vulnerability" (Buckmaster) – 2:10
"Down" (Nilsson) – 3:07
"Frankenstein, Merlin and the Operation" (Taverner) – 3:20
"Jump Into the Fire" (Nilsson) – 3:16
"The Abdication of Count Downe" (Buckmaster) – 1:10
"The End (Moonbeam)" (Nilsson) – 0:49

Personnel 
 Harry Nilsson : Vocals, piano, electric piano, mellotron
 Jim Price : Organ, horns arrangements, trumpet, trombone
 Gene Cipriano : Horns
 Bobby Keys : Saxophone, tenor sax
 Paul Buckmaster : Strings and horns arrangements and conducting 
 The Pop Arts String Quartet : Strings
 Peter Frampton : Guitar, electric guitar 
 Chris Spedding : Guitar, electric guitar, bouzouki
 John Uribe : Acoustic Guitar, Lead guitar 
 Klaus Voormann : Acoustic guitar, bass guitar
 Herbie Flowers : Bass guitar
 Jim Webb : Acoustic piano 
 Gary Wright : Piano
 Nicky Hopkins : Piano
 Ringo Starr : Drums 
 Jim Keltner : Drums
 Jim Gordon : Drums, percussions
 Ray Cooper : Percussions, congas
 George Harrison : Cowbell

References

External links
Son of Dracula at HarryNilsson.com

List of musicians

1974 films
1970s comedy horror films
1970s musical films
Apple Films films
British comedy horror films
British musical films
Films directed by Freddie Francis
Films set in London
Films shot in London
British rock music films
British vampire films
1974 soundtrack albums
Albums recorded at Trident Studios
Apple Records soundtracks
Harry Nilsson albums
RCA Records soundtracks
Musical film soundtracks
1974 comedy films
1970s English-language films
1970s British films